Göte Nordin (born 2 July 1935) is a former speedway rider from Sweden.

Speedway career 
Nordin is a two times champion of Sweden, winning the Swedish Championship in 1965 and 1971. He reached the final of the Speedway World Championship on four occasions (1961, 1962, 1963 and 1966) finishing third in the 1961 Individual Speedway World Championship.

He helped Sweden win the World Team Cup in 1962, 1963, 1964 and 1967. He won the Swedish League title on eight occasions with three clubs.

He rode in the top tier of British Speedway from 1966 until 1972, riding for various clubs.

World Final Appearances

Individual World Championship
 1961 -  Malmö, Malmö Stadion - 3rd - 12pts + 2pts
 1962 -  London, Wembley Stadium - 8th - 9pts
 1963 -  London, Wembley Stadium - 5th - 10pts
 1964 -  Gothenburg, Ullevi - Reserve - Did not ride
 1966 -  Gothenburg, Ullevi - 6th - 9pts
 1971 -  Gothenburg, Ullevi - Reserve - Did not ride

World Team Cup
 1962 -  Slaný (with Ove Fundin / Sören Sjösten / Björn Knutsson / Rune Sörmander) - Winner - 36pts (4)
 1963 -  Vienna, Stadion Wien (with Ove Fundin / Per Olof Söderman / Björn Knutsson / Rune Sörmander) - Winner - 37pts (6)
 1964 -  Abensberg, Abensberg Stadion (with Ove Fundin / Björn Knutsson / Rune Sörmander / Sören Sjösten) - Winner - 34pts (10)
 1965 -  Kempten (with Ove Fundin / Bengt Jansson / Björn Knutsson) - 2nd - 33pts (6)
 1966 -  Wrocław, Olympic Stadium (with Ove Fundin / Leif Enecrona / Björn Knutsson / Leif Larsson) - 3rd - 22pts (3)
 1967 -  Malmö, Malmö Stadion (with Ove Fundin / Bengt Jansson / Torbjörn Harrysson) - Winner - 32pts (11)
 1972 -  Olching, Olching Speedwaybahn (with Tommy Jansson / Anders Michanek / Christer Lofqvist / Jan Simensen) 4th - 18pts (1)

World Pairs Championship
 1969* -  Stockholm, Gubbängens IP (with Ove Fundin) - 2nd - 27pts (12)
* Unofficial World Championships.

References 

1946 births
Living people
Swedish speedway riders
Coventry Bees riders
Halifax Dukes riders
Newport Wasps riders
Poole Pirates riders
Wembley Lions riders
Belle Vue Aces riders
Norwich Stars riders
Wimbledon Dons riders
People from Falun
Sportspeople from Dalarna County